The Mil Mi-44 is a utility helicopter in development by the Mil Design Bureau (OKB) and based on the Mi-34.

Design and development
In the mid 1980s, the Omsk OKB started developing the TV-O-100, a light 650 hp engine designed specifically for the Mi-44. Studies conducted by Mil in 1986 and 1987 concluded that replacing the Mi-34's original M-14V26 piston engine with the TV-O-100 gas turbine engine would require changing the airframe. The resultant new airframe mockup incorporated many changes, including the relocating the fuel tank to under the gearbox and relocating the stabilizer to the keel beam in the tail.

Early users determined that two 400 hp power plants would be optimal. The most acceptable option to meet the requirement was the TVlD-450 engine, which would make the aircraft more agile.  In 1988, Mil proposed a draft Mi-44 with two 450 hp TVlD-450 engines. The design has undergone some minor changes since prototype development. With the engine configuration is still being considered, the project is still incomplete.

Specifications

References

 V. R. Mikheev, "MVZ Mil – 50 years"

Mil aircraft
Soviet and Russian helicopters
Proposed aircraft of Russia